Fredson Jorge Ramos Tavares (born 25 July 1982), known as Fock, is a Cape Verdean footballer who plays for Batuque FC as a goalkeeper.

Club career
Born in São Vicente, Fock started playing for Real Júnior Tarrafal, Sporting Clube da Praia and CS Mindelense. In 2010, he had his first experience abroad, joining a host of compatriots at AD Ceuta in the Spanish third division and being the most utilised player in his position in his first and only season.

Fock returned to his country in 2011, going on to spend two years with Batuque FC.

International career
Fock won his first cap for Cape Verde in 2009. On 24 May of the following year he appeared in a friendly in Covilhã with Portugal – who was preparing for the 2010 FIFA World Cup in South Africa – playing the entire match as the minnows (ranked 117th) managed a 0–0 draw.

References

External links

1982 births
Living people
People from São Vicente, Cape Verde
Cape Verdean footballers
Association football goalkeepers
Sporting Clube da Praia players
CS Mindelense players
Batuque FC players
Segunda División B players
AD Ceuta footballers
Girabola players
Atlético Petróleos de Luanda players
C.R. Caála players
S.L. Benfica (Luanda) players
Cape Verde international footballers
2013 Africa Cup of Nations players
Cape Verdean expatriate footballers
Expatriate footballers in Spain
Expatriate footballers in Angola